Holcolemma is a genus of African, Asian, and Australian plants in the grass family.

 Species
 Holcolemma canaliculatum (Steud.) Stapf & C.E.Hubb. - Tanzania, India (Tamil Nadu), Sri Lanka
 Holcolemma dispar Clayton - Queensland
 Holcolemma inaequale Clayton - Tanzania, Kenya, Somalia

References

Panicoideae
Grasses of Africa
Grasses of Asia
Grasses of Oceania
Poaceae genera
Taxa named by Charles Edward Hubbard